Joculator ridiculus is a species of minute sea snail, a marine gastropod mollusc in the family Cerithiopsidae. The species was described by Watson in 1886.

References

Gastropods described in 1886
ridiculus